The Fast On-orbit Rapid Recording of Transient Events (FORTE, occasionally stylized as FORTÉ; COSPAR 1997-047A, SATCAT 24920) is a lightweight satellite which was launched at about 8:30 AM on August 29, 1997 into a circular  low Earth orbit which is inclined 70 degrees relative to the Earth's equator, using a Pegasus XL rocket. It was developed and launched by the Los Alamos National Laboratory in cooperation with Sandia National Laboratory, as a testbed for technologies applicable to U.S. nuclear detonation detection systems used to monitor compliance with arms control treaties, and later to study lightning from space. The project was sponsored by the United States Department of Energy, and cost about US$35 million. Its primary mission is to record and analyze bursts of RF energy rising from the surface of the Earth. It consists of three decks with aluminum honeycomb cores, and composite facing to support the onboard instruments.

References

External links 

 Los Alamos National Laboratory: FORTE (Fast On-orbit Recording of Transient Events)

Reconnaissance satellites of the United States
United States Department of Energy
Satellites of the United States Air Force
Spacecraft launched in 1997
Spacecraft launched by Pegasus rockets